Verkhnezeysk is a rural locality (a settlement) and the administrative center of Verkhnezeysky Selsoviet of Zeysky District, Amur Oblast, Russia. The population was 1366 as of 2018. There are 14 streets.

Geography 
Verkhnezeysk is located on the north-east bank of the Zeya reservoir, 250 km northeast of Zeya (the district's administrative centre) by road. Gorny is the nearest rural locality.

References 

Rural localities in Zeysky District